Albert David (30 November 1896 – 14 December 1970) was a French sculptor. His work was part of the sculpture event in the art competition at the 1924 Summer Olympics.

References

1896 births
1970 deaths
19th-century French sculptors
20th-century French sculptors
20th-century French male artists
French male sculptors
Olympic competitors in art competitions
People from Côte-d'Or
19th-century French male artists